GTC Wireless is a telecommunication corporation founded in 1997. Since it was sold in 2007, its operations are solely in the wireless phone service. They are an MVNO on the AT&T network.

History
Originally GTC Telecom, GTC Wireless was founded in 1997 and changed its name in 2006. This follows their intent of shifting to being a Mobile Virtual Network Operator.

GTC Wireless was sold to Atrium Wireless Partners, LLC in November, 2007. They are an independent company and are no longer affiliated with GTC Telecom.

References

External links
GTC Wireless

Internet service providers of the United States
Mobile phone companies of the United States
Companies based in Morris County, New Jersey